Karrick could refer to:

Lewis Karrick (1890–1962), an American petroleum refinery engineer, oil shale and coal technologist, and inventor
Karrick process, a low temperature carbonization process
Karrick Building, a historic U.S. building located at Eau Gallie, Florida